= 1986 Guamanian balanced budget referendum =

Guamanian ballot measure

A referendum on introducing balanced budgets was held in Guam on 1 November 1986. Although more voters voted "yes" than "no", the Santos Amendment had required that the referendum required at least 50% of all votes in favour to pass. As a result, the proposal was rejected.
